USS PCE-882 was a  for the United States Navy during World War II. She was renamed ROKS Noryang (PCEC-51) after being acquired by the Republic of Korea Navy on 11 February 1955.

Construction and career
PCE-867 was laid down by Albina Engineer & Machine Works, Portland on 26 August 1943 and launched on 3 December 1943. She was commissioned on23 February 1945. In 199, she was renamed to PCEC-882.

After the end of the Korean War, the Republic of Korea Navy acquired the ship and renamed it to ROKS Noryang (PCEC-51) on 11 February 1955.

In 1959, Noryang sank a spy ship within the waters of Soyeonpyeong. Near the coast of Samcheonpo in 1977, she participated in a counter-espionage operation.

References

PCE-842-class patrol craft
1943 ships
Ships built in Portland, Oregon
Ships transferred from the United States Navy to the Republic of Korea Navy